The Omaha Lancers are a Tier I junior ice hockey team and are members of the Western Conference of the United States Hockey League (USHL). Founded in 1986, the Lancers play at the Liberty First Credit Union Arena in Ralston, Nebraska. Previous arenas of use include the Omaha Civic Auditorium, Mid-America Center, Ak-Sar-Ben Coliseum, and Motto McLean Ice Arena.

The Lancers have claimed a league-record seven Clark Cup championships as playoff champions, five Anderson Cup titles as regular season champions, and two USA Hockey national championships. In addition, the Lancers have aided in the development of hundreds of NCAA Division I hockey players, National Hockey League (NHL) draft picks, and dozens of NHL players.

History
In 2014, the majority ownership of the Lancers was bought by Crossbar Down, LLC, led by Anthony DiCesare, from the American Hockey Group, Inc, who had owned the franchise since 2004.

On July 10, 2021, Chadd Cassidy was hired as head coach and general manager. During the 2021–22 season, the players boycotted the team and the coaching staff resigned on November 18 citing operational budget cuts causing inadequate player treatment and coaching the resources. The league then postponed the three scheduled weekend games and placed team president Dave DeLuca on administrative leave. Former Fort Wayne Komets' head coach Gary Graham was then brought in as interim head coach and the league designated Josh Mervis to oversee operations of the team while an investigation into the operations of the team was underway. In January 2022, the majority ownership of the Lancers was transferred from Anthony DiCesare to Mike Picozzi.

Roster
As of September 21, 2022.

|}

Lancers NHL alumni
Keith Ballard: Phoenix Coyotes (2004–2008), Florida Panthers (2008–2010), Vancouver Canucks (2010–2013), Minnesota Wild (2013–2015)
Jacob Bryson: Buffalo Sabres
Thatcher Demko: Vancouver Canucks
Ryan Donato: Boston Bruins, Minnesota Wild, San Jose Sharks
Dan Ellis: Dallas Stars, Nashville Predators, Tampa Bay Lightning, Anaheim Ducks, Carolina Hurricanes, Florida Panthers
Jakob Forsbacka Karlsson: Boston Bruins
Erik Haula: Minnesota Wild, Vegas Golden Knights, Carolina Hurricanes, Florida Panthers, Nashville Predators, Boston Bruins
Louis Leblanc: Montreal Canadiens, Anaheim Ducks
Alex Lyon: Philadelphia Flyers
Ryan Malone: Pittsburgh Penguins (2003–2008), Tampa Bay Lightning (2008–2014), New York Rangers (2014–2015)
Will O'Neill: Philadelphia Flyers
Jed Ortmeyer: New York Rangers, Nashville Predators, San Jose Sharks, Minnesota Wild, Florida Panthers
Tucker Poolman: Winnipeg Jets, Vancouver Canucks
Trevor Smith: Toronto Maple Leafs, New York Islanders, Tampa Bay Lightning, Pittsburgh Penguins
Paul Stastny: Colorado Avalanche, St. Louis Blues, Vegas Golden Knights, Winnipeg Jets

References

External links
Omaha Lancers

Sports in Omaha, Nebraska
United States Hockey League teams
Ice hockey teams in Nebraska
1986 establishments in Nebraska
Ice hockey clubs established in 1986